Heartland RVs is an American manufacturer of recreational vehicles located in Elkhart, Indiana. Founded by former Damon Corp. CEO Brian Brady in 2003, it was purchased and became a subsidiary of Thor Industries in 2010.

History
Heartland RV was founded in December 2003 by a group of RV industry veterans led by Brian Brady, formerly President and CEO of Damon Corp. The company started production in March 2004 with a 5th wheel under the Landmark brand name which was introduced in December 2004 at the Louisville Show. Landmark was introduced with industry first features such as a Universal Docking Center (UDC), Texas-sized unobstructed pass through storage, and a patent pending front cap design for an 88 degree turn with a short box truck. The first Landmark floorplan was the Golden Gate model (a 36’ 3-slide unit).

The founding partners that joined Brady were Tim Hoffman, VP of Sales; Douglas Lantz, VP Administration; John Rhymer, VP of Engineering; Scott Tuttle, VP of Marketing and Dealer Services.

As of 2010 Heartland has 1,100 employees, and 11 facilities supporting customer service, subassembly, and full unit manufacturing. Presently, Heartland produces 20,000 units a year and is the 3rd largest 5th wheel manufacturer and 5th largest travel trailer manufacturer in the United States.

Catterton Partners, a Connecticut-based private equity firm that focuses on consumer business, made an equity investment in Heartland in February 2007.

On February 2, 2010 Heartland RV acquired the remaining active trademarks of the towable brands of Fleetwood Enterprises, Inc. Fleetwood has some of the most recognized and iconic brands in the industry. The brand names include Prowler, Terry, Mallard, Pioneer, and Wilderness.

On September 17, 2010, Thor Industries, Inc. (THO) acquired Heartland Recreational Vehicles, LLC.

On May 29, 2012, Chris Hermon became the President of Heartland RV, replacing retired founding President, Brian Brady.

References

External links
 
 Thor Industries company website
 Heartland Owners Forum

Companies based in Elkhart County, Indiana
Caravan and travel trailer manufacturers
Vehicle manufacturing companies established in 2003